Emperor Xiaoming may refer to:

Emperor Ming of Han (28–75)
Emperor Xiaoming of Northern Wei (510–528)
Xiao Kui (542–585), emperor of Western Liang

See also
Emperor Xiaomin of Northern Zhou